"The Kill" is a song by Thirty Seconds to Mars.

The Kill may also refer to:

The Kill (novel) or La Curée, a novel by Émile Zola
"The Kill", a song by Joy Division from Still

See also
Kill (disambiguation)
The Kills (disambiguation)